Olkusz County is a unit of territorial administration and local government (powiat) in Lesser Poland Voivodeship, southern Poland. It came into being on January 1, 1999, as a result of the Polish local government reforms passed in 1998.

As of 2008 its total population is 113,910, out of which the population of Olkusz is 37,552, that of Bukowno is 10,695, that of Wolbrom is 9,075, and the rural population is 56,964.

Neighbouring counties
Olkusz County is bordered by Zawiercie County to the north, Miechów County to the east, Kraków County to the south-east, Chrzanów County to the south-west, and the city of Dąbrowa Górnicza and Będzin County to the west.

Administrative division
The county is subdivided into six gminas (one urban, two urban-rural and three rural). These are listed in the following table, in descending order of population.

Industry
ZGH Boleslaw is a leading miner and producer of zinc products in eastern Europe. The history of zinc mining in the area dates to the 12th century when Casimir II the Just set up a mining settlement in the old area of Olkusz. The company has modernized its plants, and earned an ISO 9001 certificate.

References
 Polish official population figures 2006

External links
 ZGH Boleslaw

 
Olkusz